The Game of Monogamy is the first solo album by Cursive and The Good Life frontman Tim Kasher. It was released on 5 October 2010 in the UK.

The album features musical assistance from members of Cursive and Minus the Bear.

Track listing
 "Monogamy Overture" - 1:54
 "A Grown Man" - 2:01
 "I'm Afraid I'm Gonna Die Here" - 4:50
 "Strays" - 4:53
 "Cold Love" - 2:47
 "Surprise, Surprise" - 1:04
 "There Must Be Something I've Lost" - 4:57
 "Bad, Bad Dreams" - 2:56
 "No Fireworks" - 4:07
 "The Prodigal Husband" - 3:13
 "Monogamy" - 5:17

References

External links
Saddle Creek Records
Tim Kasher - Official Website
Tim Kasher on Last.fm

2010 debut albums
Saddle Creek Records albums
Tim Kasher albums